Frank Timothy Pacelli (August 23, 1924 — March 7, 1997) was an American television director and producer.

Positions held
Producer on Children's Theatre; 1964
Director on Watch Mr. Wizard, Hawkins Falls, Children's Theatre, Days of Our Lives, Return to Peyton Place, The Bold and the Beautiful; and The Young and the Restless; (hired by William J. Bell); 1982–1995

Awards and nominations
Born in Chicago, Pacelli had been nominated for thirteen Daytime Emmy Awards in the categories Outstanding Direction for a Drama Series and Outstanding Drama Series Directing Team, for his work on Days of Our Lives and The Young and the Restless. He was nominated from 1979 to 1997, and won six times in 1986, 1987, 1988, 1989, 1996, and 1997. He was also nominated for a Directors Guild of America award for Outstanding Directorial Achievement in Daytime Serials in 1998, for his work on Y&R. His first DE win was shared with Dennis Steinmetz, Rudy Vejar, Randy Robbins and Betty Rothenberg.

Frank Pacelli died in Los Angeles at the age of 72.

External links

1924 births
1997 deaths
Emmy Award winners
Television producers from Illinois
American television directors
20th-century American businesspeople
Male actors from Chicago